The Duchess of Athens is a German comic opera with music by Friedrich Lux and the libretto by writer Wilhelm Jacoby. Jacoby, who was well known for his farces, based the work on a play by the Greek writer Aristophanes. The work was first published in 1884, and received its première in Mainz in 1896.

References

Bibliography
 Grange, William. Historical Dictionary of German Theater. Scarecrow Press, 2006.
 Parsons, Charles H. The Mellen Opera Reference Index: Opera librettists and their works A–L. Edwin Mellen Press, 1987.

Plays by Wilhelm Jacoby
Operas
1884 operas
Operas by Friedrich Lux
German-language operas
Operas based on works by Aristophanes